William Frederick Clapp (1880–1951) was a specialist in mollusks at Harvard University's Museum of Comparative Zoology and one of the people who influenced William J. Clench to go into the study of mollusks.

From 1911-1923 Clapp was curator of the MCZ's mollusk collection. In the later year he went to the Massachusetts Institute of Technology where he conducted research on the Teredinidae. He also later established his own laboratory in Duxbury, Massachusetts to try to develop methods to control these mollusks which often are destructive to ships.

Sources
entry in a listing of New England Naturalists
note from Harvard on Clapp's death

1880 births
1951 deaths
Harvard University staff
American malacologists
Massachusetts Institute of Technology faculty
20th-century American zoologists